Ricardo Pérez (born May 30, 1995) is a Mexican footballer.

Career

College
Pérez played four years of college soccer at Creighton University between 2013 and 2016. While at college, Pérez played for USL PDL sides Albuquerque Sol and Ocala Stampede.

Club
Pérez signed a homegrown player deal with Colorado Rapids on January 6, 2017.

On May 3, 2017, he joined United Soccer League side Colorado Springs Switchbacks on loan.

In March 2018, Pérez moved on loan to Colorado's USL affiliate side Charlotte Independence.

2019 saw Péerz loaned out again, this time to USL League One side Lansing Ignite.

References

External links
 
 
 Creighton profile

1995 births
Living people
Mexican footballers
Mexican expatriate footballers
Expatriate soccer players in the United States
Footballers from Chihuahua
Soccer players from Colorado
Sportspeople from Fort Collins, Colorado
Albuquerque Sol FC players
Association football midfielders
Charlotte Independence players
Colorado Rapids players
Colorado Springs Switchbacks FC players
Creighton Bluejays men's soccer players
Lansing Ignite FC players
Ocala Stampede players
USL Championship players
USL League One players
USL League Two players
Homegrown Players (MLS)